Anfo is a comune in the province of Brescia in northern Italy, roughly halfway between Milan and Venice. It is in the Lombardy region near Lake Idro and is bounded by other communes of Bagolino and Collio.

References

External links
https://web.archive.org/web/20071012212207/http://www.vallesabbia.info/bin/index.php?id=118

Cities and towns in Lombardy